Famechon is a former railway station located in the commune of Famechon in the Somme department, France. The station was served by TER Haute-Normandie and TER Picardie trains between Amiens and Rouen.

The station is one of several of low importance along the 139 km long line; according to the SNCF it averaged 3 passengers per operating day in 2003. As of 2017, it is closed for passenger traffic.

See also
List of SNCF stations in Hauts-de-France

References

External links
 La gare de Famechon at Picardie Regional Council 

Defunct railway stations in Somme (department)